Sadece Sen (English title: Only You)  is a 2014 Turkish drama film directed by Hakan Yonat. This film is a remake of the 2011, South Korean film, Always. The film was also made in Hindi, Do lafzon ki kahani

Cast

References

External links 

2014 romantic drama films
Remakes of South Korean films
Turkish romantic drama films